Great Meadow National Nature Park (Velykyi Luh) covers historic steppe terrain in southeast Ukraine. It is on the south bank of the Dnieper River's Kakhovka Reservoir, which was created by the Dnieper Hydroelectric Station. The meadows and reed beds on the shore support one of the largest transmigration spots for birds in Eastern Europe. The park is in the administrative district of Vasylivka Raion in Zaporizhzhia Oblast.

Topography
The park is mostly situated on the terrace floodplain of the south side of the Dnieper River. Because most of the terrace (historically been called the "Great Meadow") was inundated by the creation of the reservoir, the park's territory is mostly ridges and coastal strips along the shore. One of the ecologically protected areas of the park is the Sim Maiakiv Floodplain, a Ramsar wetland site that houses high levels of biodiversity in the steppe-forest and reed beds of the mouth of one of the reservoir's tributaries.

The site is located in the northwest of the larger region of the Black Sea Lowland.

Climate and ecoregion
The park is in the Pontic–Caspian steppe ecoregion.

Flora and fauna
The park is an important transmigration, nesting, and foraging area for waterbirds. The karst topography provides a mechanism for filtering water, the floodplain with highly variable water coverage provides foraging grounds, and the limestone coastal cliffs provide nesting areas for the birds.
 The warm, flat, shallow portion of the terrace that is submerged provides an extensive habitat for feeding fish. The unique karst sinkholes of the area support large colonies, and many species of, bats

Public use
The park was designed to includes dedicated sectors for protection of nature, recreation, cultural and historical tourism and study, and buffer zones. Staff in the park sponsor educational and ecological awareness activities for local children and adults. The park currently has four health activity trails, a hiking/bicycle route, and four ecological study trails.

See also
 National Parks of Ukraine

References

External links

National parks of Ukraine